Pyrgocythara fuscoligata is a species of sea snail, a marine gastropod mollusk in the family Mangeliidae.

Description

Distribution
This marine species occurs off Pacific Panama.

References

Further reading
 

fuscoligata
Gastropods described in 1856
Taxa named by Philip Pearsall Carpenter